Daniel Negers is a French professor who has done extensive study of Telugu language and culture. He has translated knowledge of Telugu into French. He taught Telugu language to students of France.

Early life 
Daniel Negers was born in Paris, France.

Research on Telugu culture 
Daniel first came to India in 1970's as a tourist and returned to Peddapuram a town in Andhra Pradesh, India in 1983 along with his wife for his field study on a Telugu folk tradition called Burrakatha. He fell in love with the culture and learned to speak and write the local language. He was trained under Devadula Brahmanandam. After the death of Brahmanandam, his companion Allada Rama Rao helped him in completing his research. During his research his family stayed in Peddapuram. He dedicated his book on Burra Katha to Nazar who is known for spreading the awareness of this art.

He studied the writings of poets like Palkuriki Somana, Gurajada Apparao, Rayaprolu Subbarao, Ravuri Bharadwaja. He translated poems of Vemana into French. He wrote French-Telugu dictionary.

Rewards 
He was felicitated by Telugu Association of Netherlands (TANE) at its Ugadi celebrations, 2014.
Daniel Negers was felicitated on 2015 in Vizag on the occasion of 11th annual Lok Nayak Foundation awards ceremony. He was awarded INR 50,000 for contribution towards the spread of Telugu language and culture.

References 

Dravidologists
French social scientists
Living people
Year of birth missing (living people)